Robert Antral  (Châlons-en-Champagne July 13, 1895 – Paris June 7, 1939)  was a French painter and printmaker, mainly of etchings. He won the Prix Blumenthal in 1926 and the Croix de Guerre for his bravery in World War I.

Museums
 Musée d'art moderne de la ville de Paris.
 Musée des Beaux-Arts et d'Archéologie de Châlons-en-Champagne
 Musée des Beaux Arts de Nantes.
 Whitworth Art Gallery Manchester
 Musée de Lausanne
 Musée d'Alger
 Musée de Bilbao

References

1895 births
1939 deaths
People from Châlons-en-Champagne
20th-century French painters
20th-century French male artists
French male painters
Prix Blumenthal
French military personnel of World War I